The Dossenbach Orchestra (DO) was an American orchestra based in the city of Rochester, New York that was active from 1900 to 1912. The orchestra was formed by Mathias Dossenbach. In 1912 the orchestra was restructured to form the Rochester Orchestra.

References

Disbanded American orchestras
Musical groups established in 1900
Musical groups disestablished in 1912
Musical groups from Rochester, New York
1900 establishments in New York (state)
1912 disestablishments in New York (state)